Bring Yo' Ass To The Table is the second full-length album by the Indiana rock band Left Lane Cruiser, their first under the Alive Records label.

Critical reception
AllMusic called the album "stunning," writing that "this is the blues in their purest form, rough and ragged, rubbed raw by too much hard living and too many tough breaks." Exclaim! wrote that the duo "certainly sound ready to compete with peers like the Black Keys ... [they] actually possess enough chops to write some memorable songs." The Star Tribune wrote that "the lo-fi, hard punk-blues sound is raw, gritty and often ferocious, thanks to singer Joe Evans' aggressive slide guitar and Brenn Beck's minimalist percussion."

Track listing

Personnel
Brenn Beck - drums
Joe Evans - guitar

References

2008 albums
Left Lane Cruiser albums
Alive Naturalsound Records albums